The Chokhrak is a river of southwest Russia, a left tributary of the Laba. It flows through the Republic of Adygea.

References

Rivers of Adygea